This article provides information on candidates who stood for the 1901 Australian federal election. The election was held on 29/30 March 1901.

House of Representatives
Successful candidates are highlighted in the relevant colour. Where there is possible confusion, an asterisk (*) is also used.

New South Wales

Queensland

 There was no Protectionist organisation in Queensland. Elected candidates joined the Protectionists in Parliament.
 There was no Free Trade organisation in Queensland.

South Australia
Note that South Australia was constituted as one seven-member division, with each elector casting seven votes.

Tasmania
Note that Tasmania was constituted as one five-member division, with each elector casting one vote.

 There was no Labour organisation in Tasmania; O'Malley joined the Labour Caucus when Parliament sat.

Victoria

Western Australia

Senate
Tickets that elected at least one Senator are highlighted in the relevant colour. Successful candidates are identified by an asterisk (*).

New South Wales
Six seats were up for election.

Queensland
Six seats were up for election.

 There was no Protectionist organisation in Queensland. Glassey and Drake, when elected, sat with the Protectionists in Parliament.
 There was no Free Trade organisation in Queensland. Ferguson, when elected, sat with the Free Traders in Parliament.

South Australia
Six seats were up for election.

Tasmania
Six seats were up for election.

 O'Keefe joined the Labour Party when Parliament sat (there was no Labour organisation in Tasmania).

Victoria
Six seats were up for election. Fraser and Zeal sat as Protectionists once elected.

Western Australia
Six seats were up for election.

References
Adam Carr's Election Archive - House of Representatives 1901
Adam Carr's Election Archive - Senate 1901

See also
 Members of the Australian House of Representatives, 1901–1903
 Members of the Australian Senate, 1901–1903
 List of political parties in Australia

1901 in Australia
Candidates for Australian federal elections